The Karrani dynasty was founded in 1564 by Taj Khan Karrani, an ethnic Afghan from the Karlani tribe, hailing from Bangash district. It was the last dynasty to rule the Sultanate of Bengal.

Founding
Taj Khan was formerly an employee of the Sur Emperor Sher Shah Suri. From 1562 to 1564, Taj Khan captured south-eastern Bihar and west Bengal, and with his assassination of the last Muhammed Shahi ruler, he seized all of Bengal. The capital was at Gaur. Taj Khan was followed by Sulaiman Khan Karrani, who shifted the seat of government from Gaur to Tanda (also in Malda) in 1565. In 1568, Sulaiman Khan annexed Orissa to the Karrani sultanate permanently. Nominally he accepted sovereignty of the Mughal Emperor Akbar, and his prime minister Lodi Khan placated the Mughals with gifts and banqueting. Sulaiman Khan's authority extended from Koch Bihar to Puri, and from Son River to Brahmaputra River.

Mughal invasion
On 25 September 1574, the Mughal general Munim Khan captured the Karrani capital Tanda. The Battle of Tukaroi fought on 3 March 1575 forced Daud Khan Karrani, the last Karrani ruler, to withdraw to Orissa. The battle led to the Treaty of Katak in which Daud ceded the whole of Bengal and Bihar, retaining only Orissa. The treaty eventually failed after the death of Munim Khan who died at the age of 50 in October 1575. Daud Khan took the opportunity and invaded Bengal, declaring independence from Akbar. The Mughal onslaught against the Karrani sultanate ended with the Battle of Rajmahal on 12 July 1576, led by the Mughal general Khan Jahan I. Daud Khan was executed. However, the Pashtuns and the local landlords known as Baro Bhuyans led by Isa Khan continued to resist the Mughal invasion. Later in 1612 during the reign of Jahangir, Bengal was decisively consolidated as a Mughal province.

List of rulers

See also
Sur Empire
Lodi dynasty
Bhopal State

References

 
Pashtun dynasties